In Japan, Kōshien (甲子園) generally refers to the two annual baseball tournaments played by high schools nationwide culminating at a final showdown at Hanshin Kōshien Stadium in Nishinomiya, Hyogo, Japan. They are organized by the Japan High School Baseball Federation in association with Mainichi Shimbun for the National High School Baseball Invitational Tournament in the spring (also known as "Spring Kōshien") and Asahi Shimbun for the National High School Baseball Championship in the summer (also known as "Summer Kōshien").

Both of these nationwide tournaments enjoy widespread popularity similar to that of NCAA March Madness in the United States, arguably equal to or greater than professional baseball. Summer qualifying tournaments are televised locally and each game of the Spring and Summer tournaments at Kōshien are televised nationally on NHK alongside the TV channels Associated to organizer newspapers the tournaments. The tournaments have gone on to become national traditions, and large numbers of frenzied students and parents travel from their hometowns to cheer for their local team. It is common to see players walking off the field in tears after being eliminated from the tournament by a loss, especially on Summer Tournament, since it symbolizes the 3rd Year players retirement from High School Baseball.

The star players of the championship team will achieve a degree of celebrity status. For players, playing at Kōshien becomes a gateway to playing at the professional level. Due to the recruiting practices of Japanese high schools, top prospects often play on strong teams that were able to reach the final tournament at Kōshien. Many professional baseball players first made their mark at Kōshien, including Eiji Bandō, Sadaharu Oh, Koji Ota, Suguru Egawa, Masumi Kuwata, Kazuhiro Kiyohara, Hideki Matsui, Daisuke Matsuzaka, Yu Darvish, Masahiro Tanaka, Yusei Kikuchi, and Shohei Ohtani.

Background
There are two main tournaments:
 National High School Baseball Invitational Tournament ("Spring Kōshien")
 National High School Baseball Championship ("Summer Kōshien")

In addition, there was a separate and less well-known Meiji Jingu Baseball Tournament that was held each year in November at Jingu Baseball Stadium in Tokyo. Beginning with the 2002 tournament, the region of the winning school receiving one extra bid is guaranteed a spot in the following Spring tournament at Kōshien, mostly this bid is given away to the Meiji winner school as matters of respect for winning the Meiji Tournament.

Particulars

In the week preceding the tournament in spring and summer, teams who have won a spot in the tournament each hold a 30-minute practice on the grounds of Hanshin Kōshien Stadium. This is mainly to help the players adjust to the environment of the stadium. In the summer, due to scheduling conflicts with the Hanshin Tigers of Nippon Professional Baseball, the Tigers are forced to host their home matches on Osaka Dome, on older days, the Tigers used to make a road trip every year during this period to allow the tournament to take place, this period was also called "The Infernal Road" due the difficulties the team had to endure.

In addition, teams are able to practice during the tournament at public and private facilities made available in Nishinomiya, and neighboring Osaka, Amagasaki, and Kobe.

Usually, 1st year students are not selected to take part in Spring Kōshien, so in three years of high school there are five chances for a player to go to Kōshien.

Notable episodes

Spring/Summer Champions
Known in Japanese as 春夏連続優勝 (haru-natsu renzoku yuusho) or Spring-Summer Consecutive Champions, this signifies the winning of the senbatsu (Spring) and senshuken (Summer) tournaments in a calendar year.  To date there have been 8 instances of such a feat:

Participation of overseas teams
Before World War II, teams from Taiwan, Korea, and Manchuria, which were all part of the Japanese Empire at the time, participated in the tournaments (in the spring only Taiwan took part). The first overseas teams to participate were Pusan Commercial School of Korea and Dalian Commercial School of Manchuria in the 1921 Summer Kōshien. Foreign teams have made it as far as the championship game, but have never won the tournament. The last tournament including foreign teams was the 1940 Spring Kōshien.

Six-time Kōshien participants
Currently, the maximum number of times a player can appear in Kōshien is five.
However, under the old secondary school system, a player could appear more than five times. Here are two examples.

Makeshift Kōshien
The tournament was suspended due to the war from summer 1941 until spring 1946, with the exception of a "Promote the Fighting Spirit" tournament held by the Ministry of Education in 1942 at Kōshien. The number of teams was only 16 compared with 23 at the previous tournament, but each region held qualifying tournaments and sent teams to a national tournament. The military theme was prevalent at the tournament, with military slogans posted on the scoreboard, and names on uniforms previously written in trendy Roman alphabet letters replaced by traditional Japanese kanji characters. The tournament proceeded smoothly and Tokushima Commercial (Tokushima) won the championship. However, since this tournament differed from past Summer Kōshiens hosted by Asahi Shimbun it is not counted as an official Kōshien tournament.

Sacred "Dirt of Kōshien"
In the 1937 Summer Kōshien, Kumamoto Tech (Kumamoto) advanced to the championship game, but lost. After the game, Kumamoto Tech player Tetsuharu Kawakami grabbed a handful of dirt from the playing field of Kōshien Stadium and put it in his uniform pocket as a memento. Some years later, in the 1949 Summer Kōshien, after Kokura High (Fukuoka) lost to Kurashiki Tech (Okayama) in the semifinals, Kokura pitcher Kunio Fukushima scooped up some Kōshien dirt and took it home. Since then, as a memento of their fleeting time on the hallowed grounds of Kōshien, players from the losing teams take home a pouch of the precious soil.

At the 1958 Summer Kōshien, Shuri High (Okinawa) became the first school to represent Okinawa (then under U.S. government rule) in a Kōshien tournament. They were eliminated in their first game by Tsuruga High (Fukui). After the game, they collected souvenirs of dirt and took them home. However, due to health regulations of the Ryūkyū government they were not allowed to keep the dirt, and it was confiscated. Some Japan Airlines flight attendants heard about this, and had a sea stone lying outside Kōshien Stadium sent to Shuri. Even today this "Monument of Friendship" lies in the yard of the school as a reminder of the first trip to Kōshien by a team from Okinawa.

Denial of participation
In the past, if a scandal was uncovered at a high school chosen to participate in the Kōshien, the school was forced to withdraw from competition in the tournament. A team's participation in the tournament was affected even by scandals not related to team members. However, recently, such unrelated incidents have had less effect on a team's participation.

Denials of Kōshien participation based on circumstances other than scandals have also occurred. In the 1922 summer tournament, Niigata Commercial High School's denial was based on a star player's illness.

Regional champions

Shirakawa Barrier and the Tsugaru Strait
This term is based on the barrier built in Shirakawa, Fukushima. No team north of the Kantō region had ever won a tournament at Kōshien. This fact became known in the high school baseball world as the "Shirakawa Barrier". At the 2004 Summer Kōshien, Komazawa University Tomakomai High (southern Hokkaidō) took the title, and in one bound leaped over not only the Shirakawa Barrier but also the Tsugaru Strait separating Hokkaido from Honshū. On the plane carrying the team and championship flag back home, at the moment the plane crossed the Tsugaru Strait, the passengers joined in unison for a celebration cheer.

In 2005, Komazawa University Tomakomai High won a second straight Summer Kōshien title, becoming the first to do so since Kokura Secondary (Fukuoka) in 1947–48. This title was tainted after the tournament, however, by reports of repeated incidents of physical punishment of one of the players, once during the tournament, by the baseball club advisor (a 27-year-old school faculty member). Besides a reprimand for withholding the report until after the tournament, the High School Baseball Federation did not punish Komazawa Tomakomai. However, the report drew widespread attention to the issue of physical punishment in youth sports in Japan. It is believed that such physical punishment probably goes heavily underreported, due to cultural tendencies.

As mentioned above, Komawaza University Tomakomai (aka Komadai Tomakomai) won the 2004 Summer Koshien, becoming the northernmost school to win since Sakushin Gakuin (Tochigi). However, the route traveled by the championship flag from Koshien to Hokkaidō did not actually pass through the Shirakawa Barrier by land, so many fans (especially in the Tōhoku region) believe that the barrier has technically not yet been broken.

Passing Hakone
In high school baseball jargon, a championship by a school in the region from
Kanagawa to Tochigi.

During the Edo period, Shirakawa and Hakone were both strategic checkpoints and official passes were needed to pass through, thus leading to these names.

The first team to "pass Hakone" was Keio Futsūbu (Tōkyō). After that, Shōnan High (Kanagawa) won in summer of 1949. Despite the fact that Keio Futsūbu won in summer of 1916, the victory by Shonan High in 1946 is known as the first "passing of Hakone". Reasons for this include the fact that 33 years had passed since the Keio Futsūbu and Shonan High victories, the fact that western Japanese teams were seen as stronger than eastern Japanese teams at the time of Shonan High's victory, and the fact that high school baseball was not yet well known in 1916. The first spring passing of Hakone was achieved by Waseda Jitsugyō (Tōkyō)
led by pitcher and future pro baseball legend Sadaharu Oh in 1957.

Also, the "fording of the Tone River" in northern Kantō has also been achieved.

Since the victory of Waseda Jitsugyō, championships by Kantō teams have become more frequent and as a result these terms have fallen out of use.

Kanmon Straits
In high school baseball jargon, when a team from Kyūshū wins a tournament. The first to "cross the Kanmon Straits" was Kokura Secondary in the 1947 Summer Kōshien. Coincidentally, Kokura Secondary repeated as champions in 1948, a feat not matched until Komadai Tomakomai also became the first team to bring the title to their region then repeated the following year.

Mountain of Aso
Based on Mount Aso in Kumamoto. In high school baseball jargon, when a team from the southern half of Kyūshū wins the tournament. The first to "pass the Mountain of Aso" was Seiseikō High (Kumamoto) in the 1958 Spring Kōshien. This has not yet been achieved in the Summer Kōshien.

Ocean crossing
In high school baseball jargon, when a team from Okinawa wins a tournament.
The first to "cross the ocean" was Okinawa Shōgaku (Okinawa) in the spring of 1999, and Konan (Okinawa) achieved the first summer championship in 2010.

Into snow country
In high school baseball jargon, when a team from the Hokuriku region wins a tournament. To date no team has achieved this. Fukui Commercial High (Fukui) in the 1978 Spring Kōshien and Seiryō (Ishikawa, alma mater of Hideki Matsui) in the 1997 Summer Kōshien reached the semifinals.  More recently, Nihon Bunri (Niigata, Niigata) reached the finals in 2009, and made an amazing comeback from down 10–4 in the bottom of the 9th with 2 outs to make it 10-9 before catcher Naoki Wakabayashi lined out to 3rd to end the game. Seiryō reached the finals in 2019, ultimately losing 5-3 against Osaka's representatives, Riseisha.

Appearances in popular culture
Some of the most famous appearances of high school baseball in popular culture are in the manga and anime series Touch, H2 and Cross Game by Mitsuru Adachi, Ace of Diamond by Yuji Terajima, and Major by Takuya Mitsuda. Those series follow the struggles of different high school teams' bids to make it to the Kōshien tournament.

An unusual appearance is in the series Princess Nine, where a private girls' high school forms a baseball team and struggles against systemic bias in the Japan High School Baseball Federation and within their own school in order to make a serious bid at making it to and winning at Kōshien. More recently, the Manga work "Karin´s Mound" (花鈴のマウンド Karin no maundo) also started playing with the idea that the Girl's National High School Championship would be also played in Koshien Stadium, a thing that still not happens on real life. In the long running baseball video game series Pawapuro Series, it is known that at least three female players (two pitchers and one catcher, until 14) made their name in Kōshien in the main series' original story line (Success Mode) and turned active players in the NPB, through one of them retired later and become a coach and lecturer in Baseball academy.

The manga and anime Big Windup! by Asa Higuchi is about high school baseball. It follows the story of a first-year pitcher and his team's struggles to get to Kōshien. It won the Kodansha Manga Award in 2007.

In the finale of the anime Zipang, radio broadcast of the "patriotic" 1942 summer tournament is playing in the background when Kadomatsu meets his grandfather back in the past.

See also
 Hanshin Kōshien Stadium
 High school baseball in South Korea
 Kokoyakyu: High School Baseball—documentary film
 National High School Baseball Invitational Tournament
 National High School Baseball Championship
 Ōendan

References

Further reading 
 Whiting, Robert. "The Schoolboys of Summer". You Gotta Have Wa (Vintage Departures, 1989), pp. 239–262.

External links

 A summary of Japanese baseball including Koshien by Jim Allen of Yomiuri Shimbun
 Japan High School Baseball Database website
 Japan High School Baseball website
 Japan High School Baseball Federation website
 P.O.V. episode on Japanese Highschool Baseball (aired on PBS, July 4, 2006)